The wedge-tailed green pigeon or Kokla green pigeon (Treron sphenurus) is a species of bird in the family Columbidae.

Description 

It is greenish yellow with wedge shaped tail. The crown is tinged with orange-rufous with variable amount of maroon on back and scapulars in male but absent in female.  

It is found in the Indian Subcontinent and Southeast Asia.  It ranges across Bangladesh, Bhutan, Cambodia, India, Indonesia, Laos, Malaysia, Myanmar, Nepal, Thailand, Tibet and Vietnam. 

Its natural habitats are subtropical or tropical moist lowland forest and subtropical or tropical moist montane forest.

References

wedge-tailed green pigeon
Birds of the Himalayas
Birds of Eastern Himalaya
Birds of India
Birds of Southeast Asia
wedge-tailed green pigeon
Taxonomy articles created by Polbot